Wayne Bowen is an American pharmacologist and biologist, currently the Upjohn University Professor of Pharmacology at Brown University.

References

Brown University faculty
American pharmacologists
21st-century American biologists
Living people
Year of birth missing (living people)